Safi ullah Sulehria, ".

Safi Ullah Sulehria belong to the famous family in the Pakistan (Rajpoot Sulehria). His father name Amanat Ali Sulehria 
Arabic masculine given names